Brigadier Thomas Krishnan Theogaraj (1919-2001) was a senior officer in the Indian Army. Brigadier Theogaraj commanded the 2nd Independent Armored Brigade and played a key role during the Indo-Pakistan War of 1965. For his role in the war he was awarded the Maha Vir Chakra.

Early military career 
He joined the British Indian Army, was selected for officer training and received an emergency commissioned into the Indian Army as a second Lieutenant 1 June 1942. He was appointed a war substantive Lieutenant 1 December 1942, later acting then temporary captain from 18 September 1944. He was posted to the 13th Duke of Connaught's Own Lancers, Indian Armoured Corps.

In April 1941 the 13th D.C.O. Lancers left India for Iraq with the 10th Indian Division. They saw action against the Vichy French in Syria and also served in Persia and Iraq before joining the British Eighth Army in North Africa. In October 1942, they moved back to Persia and then back to India.
After the Japanese surrender in 1945, the regiment moved to Java in the Dutch East Indies in support of the 5th and 23rd Indian Divisions, who were engaged in suppressing a revolt by the Indonesians.

For gallant and distinguished services during the operations in Java he received a mention in despatches

In August 1946 the regiment returned to Secunderabad and on Partition of India in August 1947, the 13th Duke of Connaught's Own Lancers were allotted to the Pakistan Army.
At this point he chose to join the Indian Army and went on to receive a regular Indian Army commission.

Private life 
He married Sakuntala and had two children, a daughter, Sheila, born 19 Oct 1948, and a son, Gokul, born 25 Aug 1949.

Indo-Pakistani War of 1965 

By 1965 he was the Brigadier commanding the 2nd Independent Armoured Brigade.
As war between India and Pakistan developed, on 8 September 1965 Pakistani armoured troops of the 1st Armoured Division pushed an offensive towards the Khem Karan area of Punjab, with the intent to capture Amritsar (a major city in Punjab, India) and the bridge on River Beas to Jalandhar.
When this commenced the 2nd Independent Armoured Brigade was sent to the area to halt this advance, as part of Operation Riddle.
The Pakistani 1st Armoured Division never made it past Khem Karan, however, and by the end of 10 September was forced to withdraw with heavy losses.

Awards 
For his courage and leadership displayed during the battle, Brig. Theogaraj was awarded the Maha Vir Chakra, the award being published in the Gazette of India, Part 1, section 1, 12 February 1966.

The citation reads:

4. Brigadier Thomas Krishnan Theogaraj (IC-4321)

The Armoured Corps

On 8 September 1965, the Pakistani troops commenced a major thrust in the Khem Karan area. Using Patton tanks, the enemy attempted encirclement of our troops with the intention of a subsequent deep armoured penetration into our territory. The armoured brigade under the command of Brigadier Thomas Krishnan Theogaraj was immediately sent to the area to halt the enemy's advance.

Brigadier Theogaraj effectively deployed his tanks to face the enemy and steadily held his ground against determined enemy attacks. At the end of the battle, over 40 enemies Patton and Chaffee tanks had been destroyed or captured intact and two of the enemy's Patton regiments were nearly wiped out. The enemy was forced to withdraw with heavy losses and never again attempted the use of tanks in a major thrust against our defences in this sector.

It was due to Brigadier Theogaraj's courage, leadership and determination, that this decisive victory against the enemy's armour was possible.

Later life 
He retired as a Brigadier and died 12 November 2001 at his residence in Madurai. The last rites were performed on the 14th November 2001 in his home town in Tirunelveli district.

See also 

 Dewan Ranjit Rai
 Captain Amarinder Singh

References

External links 

 https://www.bharat-rakshak.com/ARMY/Galleries/Wars/1965/XI/0100.jpg.html

1919 births
2001 deaths
Military personnel of the Indo-Pakistani War of 1965
Recipients of the Maha Vir Chakra
Indian Army personnel of World War II
British Indian Army officers
Indian Army officers